San Martin or San Martín (Spanish for Saint Martin) is a village and census-designated place (CDP) in Santa Clara County, California, in the southern Santa Clara Valley. Located to the south of Morgan Hill and north of Gilroy, San Martin is characterized by ranches, wineries, and orchards, as well as large estates in the foothills of the Santa Cruz Mountains.

History
San Martin was named after St. Martin of Tours, the patron saint of Santa Clara Valley pioneer Martin Murphy, a Mexican citizen who built the first Catholic church in the area.

The community has considered incorporating as a city since 2004, but concerns over the community's small size and its ability to pay for municipal services have held efforts back. Other options considered have been annexation by Morgan Hill.

Geography

Lying in a roughly 6 km-wide (4-mi-wide) southern extension of the Santa Clara Valley, it is bounded by the Santa Cruz Mountains to the west and the Diablo Range to the east.

Climate 
Due to the moderating influence of the Pacific Ocean, San Martin enjoys a warm, Mediterranean climate. Temperatures range from an average midsummer maximum of 90.2°F (32.3°C) to an average midwinter low of 33.6 °F (0.9 °C). Average annual rainfall is 480 mm (18.9 in), and the summer months are typically dry. Snowfall is rare, about once every 20 years, and is light and short-lived when it occurs. Summer months are characterized by coastal fog which arrives from the ocean around 10 p.m. and dissipates the next morning by 10 a.m. Winter months have many sunny and partly cloudy days, with frequent breaks between rainstorms. The local terrain is inconducive to tornadoes, severe windstorms and thunderstorms. The local climate supports chaparral and grassland biomes, with stands of live oak at higher elevations.

Demographics

2010
The 2010 United States Census reported that San Martin had a population of 7,027. The racial makeup of San Martin was 4,329 (61.6%) White, 27 (0.4%) African American, 71 (1.0%) Native American, 470 (6.7%) Asian, 18 (0.3%) Pacific Islander, 1,752 (24.9%) from other races, and 360 (5.1%) from two or more races. Hispanic or Latino of any race were 3,249 persons (46.2%).

The Census reported that 6,896 people (98.1% of the population) lived in households, 114 (1.6%) lived in non-institutionalized group quarters, and 17 (0.2%) were institutionalized.

There were 1,993 households, out of which 812 (40.7%) had children under the age of 18 living in them, 1,267 (63.6%) were opposite-sex married couples living together, 199 (10.0%) had a female householder with no husband present, 124 (6.2%) had a male householder with no wife present.  There were 131 (6.6%) unmarried opposite-sex partnerships, and 14 (0.7%) same-sex married couples or partnerships. 279 households (14.0%) were made up of individuals, and 98 (4.9%) had someone living alone who was 65 years of age or older. The average household size was 3.46.  There were 1,590 families (79.8% of all households); the average family size was 3.70.

The population was spread out, with 1,780 people (25.3%) under the age of 18, 713 people (10.1%) aged 18 to 24, 1,613 people (23.0%) aged 25 to 44, 2,098 people (29.9%) aged 45 to 64, and 823 people (11.7%) who were 65 years of age or older.  The median age was 38.5 years. For every 100 females, there were 103.9 males.  For every 100 females age 18 and over, there were 106.9 males.

The homeowner vacancy rate was 1.9%; the rental vacancy rate was 1.7%.  4,491 people (63.9% of the population) lived in owner-occupied housing units and 2,405 people (34.2%) lived in rental housing units.

2000
As of the census of 2000, there were 4,230 people, 1,210 households, and 994 families residing in the CDP. The racial makeup of the CDP was 65.46% White, 0.83% African American, 1.63% Native American, 6.12% Asian, 0.24% Pacific Islander, 20.97% from other races, and 4.75% from two or more races. Hispanic or Latino of any race were 39.41% of the population.

There were 1,210 households, out of which 37.4% had children under the age of 18 living with them, 67.2% were married couples living together, 9.8% had a female householder with no husband present, and 17.8% were non-families. 12.6% of all households were made up of individuals, and 3.9% had someone living alone who was 65 years of age or older. The average household size was 3.44 and the average family size was 3.66.

In the CDP, the population was spread out, with 28.3% under the age of 18, 9.2% from 18 to 24, 27.6% from 25 to 44, 26.7% from 45 to 64, and 8.2% who were 65 years of age or older. The median age was 36 years. For every 100 females, there were 103.7 males. For every 100 females age 18 and over, there were 101.6 males.

The median income for a household in the CDP was $70,064, and the median income for a family was $70,708. Males had a median income of $56,625 versus $34,792 for females. The per capita income for the CDP was $25,944. About 5.2% of families and 8.4% of the population were below the poverty line, including 4.8% of those under age 18 and 10.4% of those age 65 or over. According to Forbes Magazine, San Martin is rated as one of the country's most expensive ZIP codes with a median home price of $824,390 in 2010, despite a drop in home value of almost 20% from 2008.

Economy

San Martin is a large producer of garlic, table mushrooms, and wine. The Wings of History Museum, an aviation museum, is located next to San Martin Airport.

Government

Infrastructure

Transportation
San Martin is adjacent to a freeway, U.S. Route 101, and is the location of an uncontrolled airport, South County Airport (E16), operated by Santa Clara County. Public transportation needs are provided by Santa Clara Valley Transportation Authority (VTA) buses and a commuter rail station served by Caltrain.

References

External links

 "How San Martin Came to Be," Gilroy Dispatch, September 16, 2006

Census-designated places in Santa Clara County, California
Unincorporated communities in California
Census-designated places in California
Unincorporated communities in Santa Clara County, California